Ridgway Township is one of ten townships in Gallatin County, Illinois, USA.  As of the 2010 census, its population was 937 and it contained 470 housing units.

Geography

Cities, towns, villages
 Ridgway (east three-quarters)

Unincorporated towns
 Inman at 
(This list is based on USGS data and may include former settlements.)

Extinct towns
 New Market at 
(These towns are listed as "historical" by the USGS.)

Cemeteries
The township contains these ten cemeteries: Asbury, Callicott, Jackson, Jones, Lamb, New Zion, Old Cottonwood, Riley, Saint Joseph Catholic, and Saint Patrick Catholic.

Airports and landing strips
 Downen Heliport

Demographics

School districts
 Gallatin Community Unit School District 7

Political districts
 Illinois' 19th congressional district
 State House District 118
 State Senate District 59

References
 
 United States Census Bureau 2007 TIGER/Line Shapefiles
 United States National Atlas

External links
 City-Data.com
 Illinois State Archives

Townships in Gallatin County, Illinois
Townships in Illinois